Aira is a genus of Old World plants.

Aira may also refer to:

Aira, Kagoshima, a city in Japan
Aira, Kagoshima (Aira District), a former town in the Aira District, Kagoshima, Japan
Aira, Kagoshima (Kimotsuki District), a former town in the Kimotsuki District, Kagoshima, Japan
Aira District, Kagoshima, a district in Japan
Aira Caldera, a caldera in Japan
Aira Force, a waterfall in the Lake District, United Kingdom

People with the surname
César Aira, Argentine author
 José Manuel Aira (born 1976), Spanish footballer
Mitsuki Aira, Japanese techno-pop artist

Brand name
AIRA, one of Roland Corporation's brand names announced in 2014